Imbabura is a genus of cicadas in the family Cicadidae. There is at least one described species in Imbabura, I. typica.

References

Further reading

 
 
 
 
 
 

Taphurini
Cicadidae genera